"Best I Ever Had" is a song by American recording artist Gavin DeGraw. It was released as the lead single from his fifth studio album, Make a Move, on October 15, 2013. The song was written by DeGraw and Martin Johnson, and produced by Johnson, Kyle Moorman, and Brandon Paddock. The song evokes the thoughts that someone has when missing a loved one. The accompanying music video shows DeGraw singing by himself with scenes of past memories of his love interest.

Background
"Best I Ever Had" was the first single from singer-songwriter Gavin DeGraw's fifth album, Make a Move. It was a collaboration with Boys Like Girls' lead singer and songwriter Martin Johnson. DeGraw explains the beginning of the creation of this song by saying, "I'm sitting in the room with Martin Johnson, the guy I'd been writing with before who's really gifted, and he's like, 'Hey man, what do you think of this track?' He just starts playing this jangle-y, uptempo kind of thing, which ultimately was the foundation for 'Best I Ever Had.'"

Music video
The music video was released on DeGraw's YouTube page on YouTube/VEVO on August 6, 2013.
It features shots of DeGraw, televisions showing videos of him singing, and past memories of his love interest. By the end of the video, he is singing with a band to a full audience.

Cover versions
The song was covered by George Horga Jr. and Juhi in the Battle Rounds at the fifth season of The Voice.

Charts

Weekly charts

Year-end charts

Certifications

References

Gavin DeGraw songs
Rock ballads
2013 singles
Pop ballads
Soul ballads
Songs written by Gavin DeGraw
2013 songs
RCA Records singles
Songs written by Martin Johnson (musician)
2010s ballads